The Krairiksh family is a Thai family of Chinese descent which traces its ancestry to Phraya Kraikosa (born Roek Sae-Lim), a Hokkien Chinese born to immigrant parents who became Krommatha (lord of the Harbour Department) under King Taksin. The family name was bestowed by King Vajiravudh in 1913. Many of the descendants of the Krairiksh family occupy key positions at the bureaucracy, finance, the professions and academia.

References

 
Thai Chinese families